Horolodectes sunae is a prehistoric eutherian mammal species from the Late Paleocene of northern Alberta, Canada. The generic name means "hourglass biter" in Greek in direct reference of the hourglass-shape of its teeth.

Horolodectes, along with the slightly older genus Ferrequitherium, belongs to the family Horolodectidae.

Description
The dentition of Horolodectes comprises trenchant, posteriorly leaning premolars and comparatively primitive molars, which indicate a masticatory cycle that consisted primarily of shearing and, to a lesser degree, horizontal grinding.

References

Prehistoric eutherians
Mammal enigmatic taxa
Paleocene mammals
Prehistoric mammals of North America
Fossil taxa described in 2006